The 2018 Summit League men's basketball tournament was the postseason men's basketball tournament for the Summit League for the 2017–18 season. All tournament games were played at the Denny Sanford Premier Center in Sioux Falls, South Dakota, from March 3–6, 2018. Regular season champion South Dakota State defeated South Dakota in the championship game to win the tournament and receive the conference's automatic bid to the NCAA tournament.

Seeds

All eight teams in the Summit League were eligible to compete in the conference tournament. Teams were seeded by record within the conference, with a tiebreaker system to seed teams with identical conference records.

Schedule and results

Bracket

* indicates overtime period.

References

External links
2018 Summit League Men's Basketball Championship

Summit League men's basketball tournament
Tournament
Summit League men's basketball tournament
Basketball competitions in Sioux Falls, South Dakota
College basketball tournaments in South Dakota